The School of Broadcasting & Communication (SBC) is a part of the 'Society for Arts & Mass Communication', a non-profit, non-governmental organization (NGO) registered under 'Registrar of Firms and Societies Act, 1973', of the government of the state of Madhya Pradesh, India. It is located in Mumbai.

The school is affiliated to Makhanlal Chaturvedi National University of Journalism and Communication, Asia's only journalism university, established at the behest of India's former Prime Minister, Rajiv Gandhi. The vice president of India is the 'Kuladhyaksha' of the University. The Chief Minister of Madhya Pradesh is the Chairman of the General Council, which is the supreme decision-making authority. The council includes a member of Lok Sabha, a member of Rajya Sabha, Chairman of the Press Council of India, ten members representing different states of the country-five of them appointed by the chief ministers and five representing five Indian languages.

References

External links
 School website

Education in Mumbai
Journalism schools in India
Broadcasting schools